Robert Cochran Hilliard (May 28, 1857 - June 6, 1927) was an American stage actor.  A popular matinee idol of his day, he was nicknamed Handsome Bob.

Career
Hilliard was born in New York City in 1857, and got involved in acting through amateur productions while he was working as a clerk on Wall Street.  His professional debut was in the play False Shame in Brooklyn in 1886.  He acted in many plays until retiring in 1918.  The Oxford Companion to American Theatre states that "although he was a star for many years, most of the plays in which he acted were popular but ephemeral works."  He also made frequent appearance in vaudeville between plays.

As his nickname "Handsome Bob" might indicate, Hilliard was known for his attractive looks and for being very well-dressed in the fashions of the day.  By 1888, Hilliard was set up as a foil by the press to Evander Berry Wall as to who should be called "King of the Dudes".

Death
Hilliard died of heart disease at his home on West 58th Street in Manhattan on June 6, 1927, and was buried at Green-Wood Cemetery.  He was also suffering from diabetes.  He was survived by his third wife, Olga Everard Hilliard, and son Robert Bell Hilliard.  He was previously married to Cora Bell from 1881 to 1894, and to Nellie B. Whitehouse Murphy, who died in 1913.  He married his third wife the following year, though he was her elder by 34 years.  He had a son, Robert Bell Hilliard (d. 1928), with his first wife.

He has no known relation to the silent film actor Harry Hilliard though there is a resemblance.

Selected performances
 A Daughter of Ireland (1886)
 Blue Jeans (1890) (role of Perry Bascomb)
 The Pillars of Society (1891) (role of Johann Tonnessen)
 The Girl of the Golden West (1905) (role of Dick Johnson)
 A Fool There Was (1909)(as John Schuyler)
 The Argyle Case (1912) (as Asche Kayton)

References

External links
 
 
 Robert C. Hilliard at North American Theatre Online
 Robert C. Hilliard reads portions of the play A Fool There Was, c. 1911 recording

American male stage actors
1857 births
Bishop's College School alumni
1927 deaths
Burials at Green-Wood Cemetery
Male actors from New York City